Pan American Airways (also known as Pan Am II) was founded in 1996 after an investment group including Charles Cobb, the former Ambassador to Iceland, purchased the rights to the venerable Pan American brand after the original carrier declared bankruptcy. It was headquartered in an unincorporated area in Miami-Dade County (now a part of the City of Doral), near Miami.

History
In September 1996, Pan Am II was started with an Airbus A300 named the Clipper Fair Wind. The goal was to provide low-cost, long-distance travel to major U.S. and Caribbean cities. The new airline was led by the last Vice Chairman and Chief Operations Officer of Pan Am, Martin Shugrue, who also helped in the creation of the WorldPass frequent flyer program and who served as President of Continental Airlines and later trustee of the Eastern Air Lines estate. 

In September 1997, Pan Am Corporation, the airline operation's holding company, bought Carnival Air Lines. However, the rapid expansion and economic troubles of the two companies were too much for the new Pan Am—it only survived for two years before declaring bankruptcy. Before Pan Am and Carnival could fully merge, the holding company and its two independently operated airlines, Pan Am and Carnival, filed bankruptcy and ceased scheduled flight operations in February 1998. The operating certificate used for the first reincarnated Pan Am was abandoned in favor of the acquired Carnival's operating certificate. Pan Am, now operating with the Carnival certificate, quickly resumed limited charter operations while new owner Guilford Transportation Industries acquired certain assets of the bankrupt companies after court approval. The company emerged from bankruptcy in June 1998 forming a third incarnation of Pan Am.

Destinations

In 1997, Pan American Airways flew to the following destinations:

Aguadilla, Puerto Rico - Rafael Hernández Airport
Boston, Massachusetts - Boston Logan International Airport
Chicago, Illinois - Chicago O'Hare International Airport
Fort Lauderdale, Florida - Fort Lauderdale–Hollywood International Airport
Fort Myers, Florida - Southwest Florida International Airport
Hartford, Connecticut - Bradley International Airport
Long Island/Islip, New York - Long Island MacArthur Airport
Miami, Florida - Miami International Airport
New York City, New York - John F. Kennedy International Airport
Nassau, Bahamas - Lynden Pindling International Airport
Orlando, Florida - Orlando International Airport
Ponce, Puerto Rico - Mercedita Airport
San Juan, Puerto Rico - Luis Muñoz Marín International Airport
Santo Domingo, Dominican Republic - Las Américas International Airport
Tampa/St. Petersburg, Florida - Tampa International Airport
Washington, DC - Washington Dulles International Airport
West Palm Beach, Florida - West Palm Beach International Airport

Fleet
According to online data sources, Pan Am operated:
8 Airbus A300B4
4 Boeing 737-400

See also
List of defunct airlines of the United States
Carnival Air Lines
Pan Am Systems (operated the following three companies)
Pan American Airways (1998–2004)
Boston-Maine Airways (operated Pan Am Clipper Connection 2004-2008)
Pan Am Railways (current user of Pan Am's logos)

References

Pan Am
Defunct airlines of the United States
Airlines established in 1996
Re-established companies
Airlines disestablished in 1998